Mark McKenna (born 1959) is a professor of history at the University of Sydney, noted for his work on Aboriginal history, a biography of Manning Clark and the history of republicanism in Australia.

Biography

Early life and education 
McKenna was born in 1959 and grew up in the Sydney suburb of Toongabbie. After graduating with a Bachelor of Arts from the University of Sydney, he lived in Europe for a period and then taught in high schools in Sydney before completing his PhD at the University of New South Wales in 1996.

Awards and recognition 
His Return to Uluru was shortlisted for the 2022 Prime Minister's Literary Award for Australian history.

Bibliography

 
 McKenna, M. (2002). Building a Closet of Prayer in the New World: the Story of the Australian Ballot. United Kingdom: Menzies Centre for Australian Studies.
 McKenna, M., Hudson, W. (2003). Australian Republicanism: a Reader. Carlton, Vic.: Melbourne University Press.
 McKenna, M. (2004). This Country: a Reconciled Republic?. Sydney., NSW: University of New South Wales (UNSW) Press.
 McKenna, M. (2011). An Eye for Eternity: The Life of Manning Clark. Carlton: The Miegunyah Press.
 McKenna, M. (2016). From the Edge: Australia's Lost Histories. Melbourne: The Miegunyah Press.

References 

Living people
1959 births
Australian historians
Quarterly Essay people
University of New South Wales alumni
University of Sydney alumni